Sabicea medusula is a species of plant in the family Rubiaceae. It is west-central tropical Africa.  Its natural habitat is subtropical or tropical moist lowland forests. It is threatened by habitat loss.

References

medusula
Flora of Cameroon
Vulnerable plants
Taxonomy articles created by Polbot
Taxobox binomials not recognized by IUCN